SRH Presents: Supporting Radical Habits Vol. II is the seventh official compilation album by Suburban Noize Records released on April 3, 2007. SRH Clothing and Suburban Noize Records teamed up again to release the second SRH “Supporting Radical Habits” CD/DVD compilation. This CD/DVD features music from Kottonmouth Kings, NOFX, Tech N9ne, Slightly Stoopid, and Sen Dog of Cypress Hill among many others. The DVD features over an hour of SRH riders which include; Mike Metzger, Vince Alessi, Josh Lewan, Jeremy Sommerville, Greg Domingo, Zach Peakock, Scottie Stephens, Grant Teel, Scummy, Manley, Thomas Hancock, Sean Doucett, James Lovette, Jim McNeil, Joe Crimo, Wes Agee, Jeremy Fulmer and more of the Subnoize and SRH members.

Track listing

SRH Clothing

References

2007 compilation albums
Suburban Noize Records compilation albums
Hip hop compilation albums
Alternative rock compilation albums